The 2014 European Men's and Women's Team Badminton Championships was held in Basel, Switzerland, from February 11 to February 16, 2014.

Medalists

Men's team

Final stage

Final

Women's team

Final stage

Final

References

External links
EMTC & EMWC 2014 - Tournament Software

European Men's and Women's Team Badminton Championships
European Men's and Women's Team Badminton Championships
Badminton tournaments in Switzerland
2014 in Swiss sport
International sports competitions hosted by Switzerland